The women's 10 metre platform diving competition at the 2012 Olympic Games in London took place on 8 and 9 August at the Aquatics Centre within the Olympic Park.

The competition comprised three rounds:

Preliminary round: All 26 divers perform five dives; the top 18 divers advance to the semi-final.
Semi-final: The 18 divers perform five dives; the scores of the qualifications are erased and the top 12 divers advance to the final.
Final: The 12 divers perform five dives; the semi-final scores are erased and the top three divers win the gold, silver and bronze medals accordingly.

Schedule 
All times are British Summer Time (UTC+1)

Results

References

Diving at the 2012 Summer Olympics
2012
2012 in women's diving
Women's events at the 2012 Summer Olympics